Juhari bin Bulat is a Malaysian politician and currently serves as Speaker of the Kedah State Legislative Assembly.

Election Results

References 

Living people
People from Kedah
Malaysian people of Malay descent
Malaysian Muslims
Malaysian United Indigenous Party politicians
21st-century Malaysian politicians
Year of birth missing (living people)
Speakers of the Kedah State Legislative Assembly